Champ de Mars–Tour Eiffel (or simply Champ de Mars) is a station on RER C in Paris. The site has accommodated a total of five stations, the last of which remains in service for the Paris RER.

The station was originally built to receive goods necessary for the construction of the pavilions for the Exposition Universelle of 1867, and for subsequent World's Fairs in 1878, 1889, 1900 and 1937. The location was chosen as it was then a large piece of land devoid of buildings, facing the Trocadéro and the École Militaire. It was built on the street corner of the Avenue de Suffren and the Quai Branly.

Railway station
A junction station, it is located west of the 7th arrondissement of Paris, on the left bank of the Seine. Located at an altitude of 30.8m, it is located at Kilometric point (PK) 1,970 of the Ligne des Invalides à Versailles-Rive-Gauche. It is also the origin, at the bifurcation of Boulainvilliers, PK 2,460, the Ligne d'Ermont–Eaubonne à Champ-de-Mars.

The 1867 station
The first station was built for the Exposition Universelle (1867). This station was a terminus and the line ran from the Petite-Ceinture to the Champ de Mars. The station was demolished shortly after the Exposition.

The 1878 station

A new station was built for the Exposition Universelle (1878). The building was designed and built by Juste Lisch. It had four dead-end tracks as well as four additional parking tracks. This enabled a greater functionality than the previous station.

The station was composed of a central metallic rooftop, filled with red bricks. Two side buildings (called pagodas) encompassed the passenger concourse which were themselves hidden behind canopies which extended onto the platforms. A buffet was built to the south of the station along the Avenue de Suffren.

Champ de Mars remained open after the World's Fair and regained popularity for the 1889 World's Fair. The Eiffel Tower was built next to the station.

In mid 1894, all passenger services ended to permit the demolition of all of the level crossings. A bridge over the river Seine to link the dead-end line to the Ligne d'Auteuil was built soon afterwards which meant that the station building had to be demolished. It was moved in 1897 and used as the station building for Bois-Colombes. The building is now listed.

The 1900 station
For the Exposition Universelle (1900) the station was yet again reopened. The line was extended to Les Invalides and moved to the side of the river Seine. The CF de l'Ouest created a new through station which was situated below the Eiffel Tower as well as the newly built Celestial Globe.

As well as a passenger station, the CF de l'Ouest also built a goods station; this was situated between the Avenue de Suffren and the Boulevard de Grenelle. At the end of the World's Fair all services were transferred to Les Invalides.

The 1900 goods station
Between 1900 and 1937, the goods station was a busy coal terminal. 1910 was the scene of spectacular flooding which gave many photographers the opportunity to take curious photos of the site under water.

In 1937, the goods yard was transferred to Vaugirard and the site became an EMU shed. The depot closed in 1971.

The 1988 station

In 1988, the RER C, a new suburban railway line opened. Champ de Mars became a stop on the line serving the Eiffel Tower and the connection stop for trains from Pontoise and Versailles.

The station is currently covered, situated below the Quai Branly but many features from the original station remain such as the platform walls.

The current station has two side platforms serving 2 out of 3 tracks.

Adjacent stations
 Bir-Hakeim, on the Paris Métro Line 6, is within walking distance

See also
 List of RER stations
 List of Paris Métro stations

References

External links

 

Réseau Express Régional stations
Railway stations in Paris
Railway stations in France opened in 1867
Railway stations in France opened in 1878
Railway stations in France opened in 1900
Railway stations in France opened in 1988
Buildings and structures in the 15th arrondissement of Paris
Buildings and structures in the 7th arrondissement of Paris